Takerō, Takero or Takerou (written: 丈朗 or 豪郎) is a masculine Japanese given name. Notable people with the name include:

, Japanese economist
, Japanese baseball player

Japanese masculine given names